Kaan Ayhan (born 10 November 1994) is a professional footballer who plays as a defensive midfielder or centre-back as well as operating as a right back for Süper Lig club Galatasaray, on loan from Sassuolo. Born in Germany, he represents the Turkey national team.

Club career

Schalke 04 
Ayhan joined Schalke 04's youth academy when he was four years old. On 18 January 2012, he signed a professional contract with Schalke 04 that would last until 30 June 2015. Ayhan was assigned a number 24 shirt. Ayhan made his debut against FC Augsburg in a 4–1 win on 5 October 2013, coming on as a substitute for Ádám Szalai. On 3 May 2014, Ayhan scored his first Bundesliga goal in the 13th minute of a 2–0 victory at SC Freiburg.

In January 2016, Ayhan joined Eintracht Frankfurt on loan from Schalke for the second half of the season. Frankfurt secured the option of signing him permanently, however, the fixed transfer fee was reported as being too high for a permanent signing to be likely.

Fortuna Düsseldorf 
On 31 August 2016, Ayhan left Schalke 04 after 17 years at the club to join 2. Bundesliga side Fortuna Düsseldorf.

On 13 May 2017 Ayhan scored the third goal in a 3-2 for win over 1. FC Nürnberg, securing the 2017–18 2. Bundesliga title for Fortuna Düsseldorf.

Galatasaray 
On 28 January 2023, Galatasaray announced the official negotiations for the temporary transfer of Kaan Ayhan from Sassuolo till the end of the season. On 30 January 2023, the transfer was confirmed by Sassuolo as an initial loan with an obligation to buy.

International career
A Turkish-German, Ayhan has been capped by both Germany and Turkey junior national teams. In October 2013, Ayhan was selected for the Turkey under-21 squad. He was called up by manager Fatih Terim for Turkey's friendly match against Russia on 31 August 2016, and subsequent World Cup 2018 qualifier against Croatia. Kaan Ayhan gave his debut for the Turkish national football team on August, the 31st of 2016 in a friendly against Russia.

Career statistics

Club

International
Scores and results list Turkey's goal tally first, score column indicates score after each Ayhan goal.

Honours
Fortuna Düsseldorf
 2. Bundesliga: 2017–18

Germany U17 
 FIFA U-17 World Cup: third place 2011

References

External links
 
 
 
 
 
 
 

1994 births
Living people
German people of Turkish descent
Sportspeople from Gelsenkirchen
Citizens of Turkey through descent
Turkish footballers
German footballers
Footballers from North Rhine-Westphalia
Association football central defenders
Association football fullbacks
Association football midfielders
Turkey international footballers
Turkey under-21 international footballers
Turkey youth international footballers
Germany youth international footballers
UEFA Euro 2020 players
Bundesliga players
2. Bundesliga players
Serie A players
FC Schalke 04 players
FC Schalke 04 II players
Eintracht Frankfurt players
Fortuna Düsseldorf players
U.S. Sassuolo Calcio players
Galatasaray S.K. footballers
Turkish expatriate footballers
Turkish expatriate sportspeople in Italy
Expatriate footballers in Italy